Ten Years After is Tommy Keene's fourth studio album, released in 1996. It was his first for Matador Records (Catalog #OLE 177).

Production
The album was produced by Adam Schmitt.

Critical reception
AllMusic called the album "a must for longtime fans, as well as anyone who appreciates intelligent and well-crafted pop/rock that maintains a sharp edge." Entertainment Weekly wrote that "Keene’s smart lyrics and considerable melodic sense are intact but dated — the album is like a flower fossilized in amber." Washington City Paper wrote that the album "finds Keene fulfilling the romantic bard’s duty to toy with emotional calamity; the result is a series of dispatches on the skimpy rewards of rekindling a relationship that was doomed from the get-go." CMJ New Music Monthly called it "a solid and inviting, relentlessly tuneful record."

Track listing
All songs written by Tommy Keene, except where noted.

"Going Out Again" – 2:19
"Turning on Blue" – 4:16
"Today and Tomorrow" – 4:29
"Your Heart Beats Alone" – 4:03
"If You're Getting Married Tonight" – 2:21
"On the Runway" – 2:55
"We Started Over Again" – 3:14
"Silent Town" – 4:02
"Good Thing Going" – 2:54
"Compromise" – 3:03
"You Can't Wait for Time" – 2:11
"Before the Lights Go Down" – 3:57
"It's Not True" (Pete Townshend) – 1:28
Originally recorded by The Who in 1965, this song does not appear on the CD's or LP's track list.

Personnel

The band
Tommy Keene - vocals, guitar, keyboards
Brad Quinn - bass guitar, backing vocals
John Richardson - drums, percussion

Additional musicians
Adam Schmitt - bass guitar on "Silent Town", backing vocals on "Going Out Again" and "Compromise"
Jay Bennett - guitar on "Turning on Blue" and "We Started Over Again"
Justin Hibbard - guitar on "You Can't Wait for Time" and "Before the Lights Go Down"
Eric Peterson - guitar on "Your Heart Beats Alone"
Eric Heywood - pedal steel guitar on "If You're Getting Married Tonight"

Production
Adam Schmitt - recording, mixing, mastering
Jonathan Pines - mastering, assistant engineer
Bob DeMaa - assistant engineer
Steve Carr - recording, mixing

Additional credits
Recorded, mixed and mastered at Private Studios, Urbana, Illinois and Pachyderm, Cannon Falls, Minnesota
Recorded and mixed at Hit and Run, Rockville, Maryland
Tommy Keene - photography
Arlene Elkins - photography (live shot)
Mike Lundsgaard - photography (tube station)
Tannis Root - art direction, design
Ed Morgan - manager
"Many thanks: John Richardson, Brad Quinn, Bobby Keene, Ed Morgan, Sharon Marsh, Mike Lundsgaard, Joanna Sobol, Gerard & Chris, Billy Siegle, Adam Schmitt, Jesse Valenzuela, Phillip Rhodes, Robin Wilson, Steve Carr, Bill Leen, Scott Johnson, Rick Purcell, Jonathan Pines, Jay Bennett, Edward "B" Hargrove, Mike Leach, Rick Gerson, Eric Heywood, Bob Kimball, Josh Grier, The Crush, Dobro courtesy of One F"

References

1996 albums
Tommy Keene albums